The Art of Elegance is the sixth album and fifth studio album of actress and singer Kristin Chenoweth.

Overview
In spring 2016, Chenoweth announced via Twitter that she was working on a new studio album, set to be released in spring 2017. The release date was pushed forwards though, and in mid-August, Chenoweth announced via social media that it would be released on September 23, 2016. The following week she announced the title, and shortly afterwards released the cover photo.

Chenoweth revealed that the recording would be covers of selections from the Great American Songbook, and released the first single, "The Very Thought of You" on August 19. A second single, "Smile" was released on September 9.

This album also marks Chenoweth's second Great American Songbook-themed album. Her first was her 2001 debut album Let Yourself Go, which featured mostly classic songs from the 1940s.

Track listing

Charts

Accolades

References

2016 albums
Concord Records albums
Kristin Chenoweth albums